The 2018–19 EIHL season was the 16th season of the Elite Ice Hockey League. The regular season commenced on 8 September 2018 and ended on 31 March 2019, with the playoffs following in April 2019. The two-time reigning league champions were the Cardiff Devils, who won both the regular season and playoff titles in 2017–18.

The Devils were unable to make it three regular season titles in succession, after a season-long battle for the top position with the Belfast Giants. The league title came down to the final day of the regular season; the Coventry Blaze's 3–1 victory over the Devils at the Coventry Skydome handed the league title to the non-playing Giants, on a regulation wins (by 39 to 38) tie-break. It was the Giants' fourth regular season title, and first since 2013–14. The playoff final resulted in a matchup between the Devils and the Giants in Nottingham; the Devils achieved their second consecutive playoff title with a 2–1 victory on Gleason Fournier's game-winning goal, with 7:33 remaining.

Teams
After having twelve teams for the 2017–18 season, the league reduced to eleven for the 2018–19 season. This was due to the Edinburgh Capitals – who had finished bottom of the league with just five wins – losing the rights to use the Murrayfield Ice Rink to a consortium that was led by David Hand, the brother of former Capital Tony Hand. Hand's consortium revived the Murrayfield Racers name, with a similarly-named franchise having been active between 1952 and 1996, and attempted to join the league in place of the Edinburgh Capitals, but this request was denied. As a result, the Murrayfield Racers joined the Scottish National League. The Hull Pirates, from the National Ice Hockey League, also considered an application to the Elite League, but ultimately did not take up this option.

The league featured three conferences, just as it did in 2017–18. The Gardiner Conference remained fully Scottish but became a three-team division, with the demise of the Edinburgh Capitals; the Dundee Stars, the Fife Flyers and the renamed Glasgow Clan (formerly Braehead) making up the trio. The two other conferences remained unchanged, with four teams in each. These were the Patton Conference, consisting of the Coventry Blaze, the Guildford Flames, the Manchester Storm and the Milton Keynes Lightning; and the Erhardt Conference, consisting of the four "Arena" teams: the Belfast Giants, the Cardiff Devils, the Nottingham Panthers and the Sheffield Steelers.

Standings

Overall
Each team played 60 games, playing each of the other ten teams six times: three times on home ice, and three times away from home. Points were awarded for each game, where two points are awarded for all victories, regardless of whether it was in regulation time or after overtime or shootout. One point was awarded for losing in overtime or shootout, and zero points for losing in regulation time. At the end of the regular season, the team that finished with the most points was crowned the league champion.

The league title came down to the final day of the regular season; the Coventry Blaze's 3–1 victory over the Cardiff Devils at the Coventry Skydome handed the league title to the non-playing Belfast Giants, on a regulation wins tie-break. It was the Giants' fourth regular season title, and first since 2013–14.

Erhardt Conference
Only intra-conference games counted towards the Erhardt Conference standings. Each team played the other three teams in the Conference six times, for a total of 18 matches. The Belfast Giants won the Conference for the third time, after the Cardiff Devils lost 5–4 against the Sheffield Steelers at Sheffield Arena on 16 March 2019.

Gardiner Conference
Only intra-conference games count towards the Gardiner Conference standings. Each team plays the other two teams in the Conference six times, for a total of 12 matches. The Glasgow Clan won the Conference for the fifth time, after a 5–1 win over the Dundee Stars at Braehead Arena on 12 February 2019.

Patton Conference
Only intra-conference games counted towards the Patton Conference standings. Each team played the other three teams in the Conference six times, for a total of 18 matches. The Guildford Flames won the Conference for the first time, after a 1–0 win over the Manchester Storm at the Guildford Spectrum on 17 February 2019.

Playoffs

Bracket

Quarter-finals
The quarter-final schedule was announced after the conclusion of the final-day regular season matches.

(1) Belfast Giants vs. (8) Coventry Blaze

(2) Cardiff Devils vs. (7) Sheffield Steelers

(3) Nottingham Panthers vs. (6) Fife Flyers

(4) Glasgow Clan vs. (5) Guildford Flames

Semi-finals
The schedule for the Playoff Finals weekend was announced after the conclusion of the quarter-final matches.

Third-place match

Grand Final

Regular season statistics

Scoring leaders
The following players led the league in points at the conclusion of the regular season.

Leading goaltenders
The following goaltenders led the league in goals against average at the conclusion of the regular season, while playing at least 1140 minutes.

Playoff statistics

Scoring leaders
The following players led the league in points at the conclusion of the playoffs.

Leading goaltenders
The following goaltenders led the league in goals against average at the conclusion of the playoffs, provided they played 60 minutes.

References

External links

Elite Ice Hockey League seasons
1
United